Stenoptilia hahni is a moth of the family Pterophoridae. It is found in Spain.

References

hahni
Moths described in 1989
Plume moths of Europe
Taxa named by Ernst Arenberger